Juan Edgardo "Sonny" Manalang Angara (born July 15, 1972) is a Filipino politician and lawyer serving as a Senator since 2013. He is also the chairman of Samahang Basketbol ng Pilipinas, the governing body of basketball in the Philippines. He had previously served as the Representative of Aurora's lone district from 2004 to 2013. His father, Edgardo Angara, was the Senate President from 1993 to 1995.

Early life and education
Angara was born on July 15, 1972 in Manila to lawyer and future Senator Edgardo Angara and Gloria Manalang-Angara, a teacher who would become chairperson of the Cultural Center of the Philippines. He took up his basic education at Xavier School in San Juan, Metro Manila, then attended Douai School in the UK, and finished his Bachelor of Science degree in International Relations with honors from the London School of Economics. He finished his law degree at the University of the Philippines College of Law, and earned his Master of Laws degree from Harvard Law School in Cambridge, Massachusetts.

Early career
He worked as a trainee at the Metropolitan Bank and Trust Company (Metrobank) in Makati in 1991. He worked as a news reporter for The Philippine Star in 1992. He served as an apprentice and member of the delegation in the Philippine Mission to the United Nations in New York in 1994. He worked as an associate attorney at the Angara Abello Concepcion Regala and Cruz (ACCRA) law firm from 2001 to 2003. He taught as a professor at the New Era University (NEU) College of Law and at the Centro Escolar University (CEU) School of Law and Jurisprudence.

Political career

House of Representatives (2004–2013)
He was first elected to public office in 2004 as the representative to Congress for the lone district of Aurora, where he succeeded his aunt, Bellaflor J. Angara-Castillo, a three-term representative and erstwhile governor of Aurora. Elected at age 31, he was one of the youngest members of the 13th Congress. He was a member of the House minority and served as House deputy minority leader, thereby becoming an ex officio member of all standing and special committees of the 13th Congress.  He authored a number of laws of national significance and was able to focus on work in his constituency, where he used the funds allotted to his office to build over 100 classrooms and provided funds for indigent constituents in 12 government hospitals and hundreds of scholarships to deserving students at various state universities and colleges (SUCs).  He also worked together with socio-civic groups on various projects and funded the creation of the Gawad Kalinga villages for the homeless in three of Aurora's municipalities and the provision of computers and Internet access to Aurora's public high schools, together with the GILAS Foundation, and access to vocational, skills, and livelihood training through the Technical Education and Skills Development Authority (TESDA) and other groups.

He was elected to a second term as congressman in 2007, when he ran unopposed under the Laban ng Demokratikong Pilipino (LDP), the same political party as in 2004. He served as deputy majority leader and vice chairman of the committee on rules, also as an ex officio member of all standing and special committees in the House during the 14th Congress (2007–2010). He was one of the remaining congressmen who offered aid to some of the wounded persons and personally took some of the survivors to the nearby Far Eastern University - Nicanor Reyes Medical Foundation in Quezon City for treatment when a bomb was planted at the premises of the House of Representatives in 2008 which resulted in the death of Congressman Wahab Akbar and the death and serious wounding of other congressmen and congressional staffers. He topped the list of "prolific and hardworking members of the House of Representatives" for filing the most number of bills of national importance that were enacted into law in the 14th Congress. A report by the House Indexing and Monitoring Group of the Bills and Index Department showed that in the 14th Congress of 2007–2010, he, then deputy majority floor leader, filed 10 national bills that eventually became laws of the land.

Angara was elected to a third term as congressman for Aurora in 2010. He was a signatory to the impeachment complaint against then-Chief Justice Renato Corona, which was signed by the 188 members of the Philippine House of Representatives in December 2011, was eventually adopted as the Articles of Impeachment, and was passed for consideration of the Senate impeachment court. He acted as deputy spokesperson of the House prosecution panel, together with Marikina Representative Miro Quimbo and Quezon Representative Lorenzo Tañada III, in the impeachment trial of the Chief Magistrate.

As a three-term congressman, he authored several measures signed into law by the President of the Philippines, such as:
 Anti-Bullying Act of 2013 (Republic Act 10627)
 The Insurance Code (Republic Act 10607) 
 National Health Insurance Act of 2013 (Republic Act 10606) 
 Philippine Design Competitiveness Act of 2013 (Republic Act 10557) 
 Philippine National Health Research System Act of 2013 (Republic Act 10532) 
 Magna Carta of Women (Republic Act 9710) 
 Pre-Need Code of the Philippines (Republic Act No. 9829)
 Aurora Special Economic Zone Act of 2007 (Republict Act No. 9490)
 Tax Exemption for Minimum Wage Earners Law (Republic Act No. 9504)
 Real Estate Investment Trust (REIT) Act of 2009 (Republic Act No. 9586)
 Civil Aviation Authority Act of 2008 (Republic Act No. 9497)
 Personal Equity and Retirement Account (PERA) Act of 2008 (Republic Act No. 9505)
 Tourism Act of 2009 (Republic Act No. 9593) 
 University of the Philippines Charter of 2008 (Republic Act No. 9500) 
 An Act Providing for the Legitimation of Children Born to Parents Below Marrying Age, Amending for the Purpose the Family Code of the Philippines, as Amended (Republic Act No. 9858)
 National Cultural Heritage Act of 2009 (Republic Act 10066)
 Expanded Senior Citizens Act of 2010 (Republic Act No. 9994)
 Financial Rehabilitation and Insolvency Act (FRIA) of 2010 (Republic Act 10142)
 Kindergarten Education Act (Republic Act 10157) 
 Credit Information System Act (Republic Act 9510)
 Health Workers' Day Act (Republic Act 10069)
 Domestic Workers Act (Republic Act 10361)

Senate (2013–present)
Angara was elected to the Senate in 2013 and was reelected in 2019. He ran under the then-administration coalitions Team PNoy and Hugpong ng Pagbabago, respectively. He has sponsored or authored more than 200 laws in his nearly two decades of service as a legislator.

In the 18th Congress, Senator Angara currently chairs the Finance and Youth committees:
As chairman of the Senate Committee of Finance, Senator Angara sponsored into law measures crucial to COVID-19 pandemic response and recovery:

 Republic Act 11525, COVID-19 Vaccination Program Act
 Republic Act 11640, Extending the Availability of the 2021 General Appropriations Act
 Republic Act 11639, 2022 General Appropriations Act
 Republic Act 11520, Extending the Availability of the 2020 General Appropriations Act
 Republic Act 11519, Extending the availability of appropriations under RA 11494 or the Bayanihan 2
 Republic Act 11518, 2021 General Appropriations Act
 Republic Act 11494, Bayanihan to Recover as One Act or Bayanihan 2
 Republic Act 11465, 2020 General Appropriations Act
 Republic Act 11464, Extending the Validity of the 2019 General Appropriations Act

Other laws sponsored/authored in the 18th Congress (2019 onwards):

 Republic Act 11643, Survivorship Benefits of a Deceased Retired Member of the National Prosecution Service
 Republic Act 11635, which ensures the originally intended lower taxation rate under the CREATE Law would benefit private education institutions
 Republic Act 11591, Extending the Registration of Voters
 Republic Act 11573, Confirmation of Imperfect Titles
 Republic Act 11561, Increasing the Bed Capacity of East Avenue Medical Center
 Republic Act 11534, CREATE or the Corporate Recovery and Tax Incentives for Enterprises Act
 Republic Act 11494, Bayanihan to Recover as One Act
 Republic Act 11470, National Academy for Sports Act
 Republic Act 11466, Salary Standardization Law 5

Laws sponsored/authored in the 17th Congress (2016 to 2019):
 Republic Act 11394, Mandatory Provision of Neutral Desks in Educational Institutions Act 
 Republic Act 11392, National Performing Arts Companies Act 
 Republic Act 11364, Cooperative Development Authority Charter
 Republic Act 11362, Community Service Act
 Republic Act 11358, National Vision Screening Act
 Republic Act 11350, National Commission of Senior Citizens Act
 Republic Act 11346, Excise Tax Increase on Tobacco Products
 Republic Act 11315, Community-Based Monitoring System Act 
 Republic Act 11314, Student Fare Discount Act 
 Republic Act 11312, Amendment to Magna Carta for Scientists, Engineers and Researchers
 Republic Act 11310, Pantawid Pamilyang Pilipino Program (4Ps) Act
 Republic Act 11292, Seal of Good Local Governance
 Republic Act 11291, Magna Carta of the Poor
 Republic Act 11261, First Time Job Seekers Assistance Act
 Republic Act 11260, General Appropriations Act 2019
 Republic Act 11256, An Act to Strengthen the Country's Gross International Reserves (GIR) 
 Republic Act 11232, Revised Corporation Code of the Philippines
 Republic Act 11223, Universal Health Care Act
 Republic Act 11215, National Integrated Cancer Control Act
 Republic Act 11214, Philippine Sports Training Center Act
 Republic Act 11213, Tax Amnesty Act
 Republic Act 11210, 105-Day Expanded Maternity Leave Law
 Republic Act 11194, Gabaldon School Buildings Conservation Act
 Republic Act 11166, Philippine HIV and AIDS Policy Act
 Republic Act 11148, Kalusugan at Nutrisyon ng Mag-Nanay Act
 Republic Act 11055, Philippine Identification System
 Republic Act 11054, Bangsamoro Organic Law
 Republic Act 11036, Mental Health Act
 Republic Act 10931, Universal Access to Quality Tertiary Education Act 
 Republic Act 10928, An Act Extending the Validity of Philippine Passports 
 Republic Act 10923, Bangay/SK Elections Postponement
 Republic Act 10922, Economic and Financial Literacy Week Act
 Republic Act 10917, Special program for Employment of Students (SPES) Act
 Republic Act 10908, Integrated History Act of 2016
 Republic Act 10863, Customs Modernization and Tariff Act (CMTA) 
 Republic Act 10869, JobStart Philippines Act
 Republic Act 10844, Department of Information & Communications Technology (DICT) Act
 Republic Act 10816, Farm Tourism Act
 Republic Act 10801, Overseas Workers Welfare Administration (OWWA) Act
 Republic Act 10771, Philippine Green Jobs Act

Laws sponsored/authored in the 16th Congress (2013 to 2016):
 Republic Act 10754, An Act Expanding the Benefits and Privileges of Persons with Disability (PWDs)
 Republic Act 10747, Rare Diseases Act
 Republic Act 10741, Act Strengthening National Labor Relations Commission (NLRC)
 Republic Act 10708, Tax Incentives Management and Transparency Act (TIMTA)
 Republic Act 10706, Seafarers Protection Act
 Republic Act 10699, National Athletes and Coaches Benefits and Incentives Act
 Republic Act 10687, Unified Student Financial Assistance System for Tertiary Education Act (UniFAST Act)
 Republic Act 10679, Youth Entrepreneurship Act
 Republic Act 10665, Open High School System Act
 Republic Act 10650, Open Learning and Distance Education Act

Formerly, Angara was the chairman of the Senate Ways and Means Committee, Angara has already worked for the enactment of: 
 Republic Act 10653 that raises the take-home pay of Filipino workers by increasing the tax exemption cap for 13th month pay and other benefits from P 30,000 to P 82,000, gmanetwork.com. Accessed November 22, 2022.</ref> 
 Republic Act 10708 or the Tax Incentives Management and Transparency Act (TIMTA) that aims to promote transparency and accountability in the grant and administration of tax incentives to registered business entities so as to encourage investors to bring more businesses to the country, generate more employment opportunities, and boost Philippine economic growth.
 Republic Act 10754 or the VAT Exemption for Persons with Disability. This law exempts persons with disabilities (PWDs) from the 12-percent value added tax (VAT) on land transportation, domestic air and sea travels; on fees and charges for medical and dental services; on cost of medicines; on funeral and burial services; on fees and charges in hotels and restaurants, among others.
 Republic Act 11346 or the Increase in the excise tax on tobacco products to help fund the gap for the Universal Health Care (UHC) Act 

In the 16th Congress, Angara formerly chaired Committee on Games, Amusement and Sports where he is actively pushing for greater support for Filipino athletes and competitiveness of national sports teams competing in international competitions. Through this committee, he has authored and sponsored the following laws:
 RA 10699 or the National Athletes and Coaches Benefits and Incentives Act that increased the amount of financial incentives and benefits given to national athletes, coaches and recognition of athletes with disabilities as national athletes.
 RA 10636 granting Filipino citizenship to Andray Blatche for eligibility to join the Gilas Pilipinas national basketball team.
 Republic Acts 10674, 10680, 10681, 10682 and 10683 which established sports academies and training centers respectively in Davao de Norte, Misamis Occidental, Talisay Cebu, Alfonso Cavite and Siargao Island to hone the skills and raw talent of young athletes from the provinces and jumpstart grassroots sports development.

Angara was formerly acting chairman of the Committee on Labor, Employment and Human Resources. He sponsored RA 10691 or the amended Public Employment Service Office (PESO) Act, which aims to improve and strengthen PESOs' employment facilitation services to help more Filipinos land a job especially in rural areas and poorer municipalities, and RA 10706 or the Seafarers Protection Act, which protects Filipino seafarers from ambulance chasers, particularly lawyers, who charge excessive legal fees arising from accident, illness, or death of seafarers in the course of their service.

Personal life
He married ABS-CBN executive Tootsy Echauz in 2003; they have three children.

On March 26, 2020, he tested positive for COVID-19. He was one of the four highest ranking Philippine Government official to have been infected with the SARS-CoV2 including Senator Zubiri, Senator Pimentel and AFP Chief of Staff General Santos. He then recovered from the disease.

Awards
He was one of the Ten Outstanding Young Men (TOYM) of the Philippines awardees for 2010. He received his trophy from President Benigno Aquino III in a ceremony held at the Rizal Hall of the Malacañan. He was also a recipient of the Tanglaw ng Bayan 2011 award, the highest award given by the Polytechnic University of the Philippines (PUP) in Manila to individuals with exemplary achievements in their respective fields. He was conferred honorary doctorate in law (honoris causa) by the Ramon Magsaysay Technological University (RMTU) in Iba, Zambales in November 2011. He was one of nine recipients of the Outstanding Manilan Award in 2017.

References

External links
 
 Senator Juan Edgardo "Sonny" Angara – Senate of the Philippines

21st-century Filipino lawyers
People from Aurora (province)
University of the Philippines alumni
1972 births
Living people
Sonny
Laban ng Demokratikong Pilipino politicians
Members of the House of Representatives of the Philippines from Aurora (province)
Senators of the 18th Congress of the Philippines
Senators of the 17th Congress of the Philippines
Senators of the 16th Congress of the Philippines
Harvard Law School alumni
The Philippine Star people
Alumni of the London School of Economics
Senators of the 19th Congress of the Philippines